Setto is a town and arrondissement in the Djidja commune of the Zou Department of Benin.

Arrondissements of Benin
Populated places in the Zou Department